The Pre-Olympic tournaments of the Asian Qualifiers for the 1984 Summer Olympic were held from 12 August 1983 to 29 April 1984. Iraq, Saudi Arabia and Qatar qualified.

First round

Group 1

Group 2

Group 3

Note: Saudi Arabia played home and away matches; the other four countries played tournaments in Singapore and Kuala Lumpur.

Group 4

Group 5

Second round
All games in this round were played in National Stadium, Singapore. All times in Singapore Standard Time (SST).

Group 1

Saudi Arabia won the group and qualified for the 1984 Summer Olympics football tournament.

Group 2

Qatar won the group and qualified for the 1984 Summer Olympics football tournament.

Playoff match

Iraq won the play-off and qualified for the 1984 Summer Olympics football tournament.

References

External links
 Football Qualifying Tournament (Los Angeles, USA, 1984) - Zone Asia - rsssf.com

Asia
1984